In the years running up to the next Italian general election, which will occur no later than 22 December 2027, various organisations are carrying out opinion polls to gauge voting intention in Italy. The date range is from after the 2022 Italian general election, held on 25 September, to the present day. Poll results are reported at the dates when the fieldwork was done, as opposed to the date of publication; if such date is unknown, the date of publication is given instead. Under the Italian par condicio (equal conditions) law, publication of opinion polls is forbidden in the last two weeks of an electoral campaign.

Party vote

Graphical summary 

Parties or lists are ordered according to their share of the vote in 2022.

2023

2022

Notes

References

External links 
 
 

Future elections in Italy
Italy
Opinion polling in Italy